Eunice High School is a girls' boarding school/day school located in Bloemfontein, South Africa. The language of instruction is English. In 2015 Eunice was recognised as the Top Performing Public School in South Africa.

History

Originally named the Oranje Vrij Staat Dames Instituut, the school was founded in 1875 on the initiative of the Dutch Reformed Church. The name Eunice is a biblical reference to the mother of Timothy in the New Testament. It is a Greek word meaning "happy victory". Eunice was founded in the Scottish education tradition. Its first headmistress was summoned from Stirling to replicate Scottish standards and values in Bloemfontein.

In 1902 Ella Campbell Scarlett became the first and only doctor employed at the school, and is known as the first woman medical practitioner in Bloemfontein, South Africa.

Notable alumnae 
 Olga Kirsch, poet
 Kayla Swarts, field hockey
 Taheera Augousti, field hockey

Sports and culture 
 Athletics
 Chess
 Choir
 Debating
 Hockey
 Netball
 Swimming
 Public speaking
 Squash
 Tennis

Subjects 
 Arts and Culture
 Afrikaans
 Business Studies
 Computer Application Technology
 Economics
 English
 Life Orientation
 Life Science
 Mathematics
 Mathematical Literacy
 Music
 Physical Science
 Technology
 History

References

Girls' schools in South Africa
Boarding schools in South Africa
Schools in the Free State (province)
Educational institutions established in 1875
1875 establishments in the Orange Free State